The Mysterios were an American professional wrestling tag team composed of Rey Mysterio and his son Dominik Mysterio. They are one-time WWE SmackDown Tag Team Champions, making them the first father and son team to have won a tag team championship in WWE.

History

Dominik's early appearances (2003–2019) 
Dominik made his first professional wrestling appearance on the June 5, 2003 edition of SmackDown! at just 6 years old when he was in the crowd along with his mother Angie and his younger sister Aalyah watching his father Rey Mysterio win the WWE Cruiserweight Championship from Matt Hardy. After the match, Dominik came over the barricade and into the ring to celebrate with his father, who promptly gave him a massive hug and hoisted him up on his shoulders. Dominik made his second appearance on the December 11 edition of SmackDown! in the crowd again with Angie and Aalyah watching his father compete against WWE Champion Brock Lesnar in a non-title match in a losing effort.

In the summer of 2005, Dominik made his third appearance in WWE at the age of 8, but this time in a more prominent role, as part of his father Rey's ongoing feud with Eddie Guerrero, in which the two rivals fought for custody of him. During the storyline, Guerrero stated that he was Dominik's (kayfabe) biological father. Mysterio defeated Guerrero in a ladder match for custody of Dominik at SummerSlam. He made two more appearances in 2006, first at WrestleMania 22 with Angie and Aalyah watching his father win the World Heavyweight Championship for the first time and second on the September 15 edition of SmackDown! where he watched backstage as his father battled with Mr. Kennedy. Mysterio would lose this match after Chavo Guerrero and Vickie Guerrero showed up on the stage with Gutiérrez to distract Mysterio as Kennedy rolled him up for the win. He once again appeared on the March 12, 2010 episode of SmackDown, this time during the feud between Rey Mysterio and the Straight Edge Society (CM Punk, Luke Gallows, and Serena).

On the March 19, 2019 episode of SmackDown Live, Dominik appeared with his father, Rey Mysterio, who announced that he would be facing Samoa Joe for the WWE United States Championship at WrestleMania 35. He once again appeared on Raw from April to June, during the feud between Mysterio and Joe. During the following months, he was involved in his father's storylines and matches, including getting physically involved in Rey's WWE Championship match against Brock Lesnar at Survivor Series, where they attacked Lesnar and performed a double 619, but Rey was nonetheless defeated.

Work as a tag team (2020–2022) 
In May 2020, Dominik again assisted his father, this time in dealing with Seth Rollins and his teammates Murphy and Austin Theory, after his father suffered a severe (kayfabe) eye injury. At The Horror Show at Extreme Rules, Rey had his eye (kayfabe) removed in an Eye for an Eye match, where the winner could only be declared upon removing an opponent's eyeball from its socket. Dominik thereafter unsuccessfully came for revenge, having to be saved by his father's ally, Aleister Black. On the August 3 episode of Raw, Dominik issued a challenge to Rollins, which he accepted for SummerSlam, in what was Dominik's in-ring debut. The following week, after the SummerSlam match was made official, Rollins and Murphy attacked Dominik, landing over 30 kendo stick shots.

On August 23 at SummerSlam, Dominik made his in-ring debut, where he was defeated by Rollins in a Street Fight. The following night on Raw, Dominik and Rey teamed together for the first time in an official match, where they faced Rollins and Murphy, but the match ended in a disqualification after Retribution attacked the Mysterios. Six days later at Payback, The Mysterios defeated Rollins and Murphy to earn Dominik's first official victory in WWE. The next night on Raw, Dominik replaced his injured father in a match with Rollins, set up to determine entries into another match that was held later that night to decide the next challenger for the WWE Championship. Rollins avoided a frog splash, and went on to defeat Dominik, as a frustrated Rey looked on backstage. Next week he defeated Murphy with the help of his family in a Street Fight. The following week on Raw, Dominik once again wrestled Rollins, this time in a steel cage match where he was defeated. A new storyline developed in September, where Dominik's sister Aalyah began to show feelings for Murphy, the former disciple of Rollins. This caused unrest amongst the Mysterio family, and one such distraction caused Murphy to pin Dominik during a match. As part of the 2020 Draft in October, The Mysterios were drafted to the SmackDown brand. The Mysterio family's feud with Rollins would end on the November 13 episode of SmackDown after Rey defeated Rollins in a No Holds Barred match after assistance from Murphy, who turned on Rollins.

At the 2021 Royal Rumble, Dominik took part in his first Royal Rumble match where he eliminated King Corbin before being eliminated by Bobby Lashley. On the February 12 episode of SmackDown, the Mysterios were defeated by Corbin and Sami Zayn in an Elimination Chamber qualifying match. On the WrestleMania edition of SmackDown, the Mysterios would face defending champions Dolph Ziggler and Robert Roode, Alpha Academy (Chad Gable and Otis), and The Street Profits in a fatal four-way tag team match for the SmackDown Tag Team Championship, but were unsuccessful as Ziggler and Roode retained their titles.

At WrestleMania Backlash, despite Dominik being attacked backstage by Ziggler and Roode prior to the match, Dominik and Rey won the SmackDown Tag Team Championship, marking Dominik's first championship in WWE, and making Dominik and Rey the first father and son team to become tag team champions in WWE history. On the June 4 episode of SmackDown, the Mysterios successfully defended their titles against The Usos, albeit with controversy as Jimmy's shoulder was lifted although the referee wasn't aware. After Adam Pearce and Sonya Deville granted a rematch later that same night, the Mysterios again retained their titles after Roman Reigns interfered and attacked the Mysterios, causing a disqualification, and both were assaulted by Reigns afterwards. The following week on SmackDown, Rey called out Reigns for attacking Dominik, and challenged Reigns to a Hell in a Cell match at the namesake pay-per-view, but before Reigns could answer, Rey attacked Reigns with a kendo stick, but was ultimately overpowered, and while Dominik joined the brawl, Reigns powerbombed Dominik over the top rope and out of the ring. The next day on Talking Smack, Paul Heyman, Reigns' "special council", formally accepted Rey's challenge on Reigns's behalf. On June 17, however, the match was moved to the SmackDown prior to the pay-per-view in which Rey lost to Reigns. At Money in the Bank pre-show, The Mysterios dropped the titles to The Usos, ending their reign at 63 days.

As part of the 2021 Draft, both Rey and Dominik were drafted to the Raw brand. On the January 31, 2022 episode of Raw, The Miz defeated Dominik. The following week, the Mysterios were guests on "Miz TV". Rey claimed that Miz cheated to defeat Dominik while Miz took issue that Rey had an opportunity to qualify for the WWE Championship Elimination Chamber match while he did not and also that Rey was the cover star of the WWE 2K22 video game. Miz also questioned if Rey was truly Dominik's dad, referencing the child custody battle that Rey had with Eddie Guerrero back at SummerSlam in 2005. Dominik then defeated Miz in a rematch. Rey then defeated Miz during the Elimination Chamber Kickoff pre-show. Later backstage, Miz accused Rey of cheating due to Dominik and said he would find a tag team partner who was a "global superstar". On the following episode of Raw, as Miz teased the identity of his partner to face Rey and Dominik at WrestleMania 38, the Mysterios interrupted, stating it did not matter who Miz had chosen. Miz then revealed his partner as social media personality Logan Paul, after which, Miz and Paul attacked the Mysterios. At WrestleMania 38, the Mysterios were defeated by Miz and Paul.

The Mysterios later began feuding with The Judgment Day (Finn Bálor, Damian Priest, and Rhea Ripley) over the group's desire to recruit Dominik, with the latter continuously refusing, leading to the group attacking the Mysterios in several occasions. During Rey's 20th anniversary celebration on the July 25 episode of Raw, the Mysterios defeated Bálor and Priest in a tag-team match. Afterwards in a backstage segment, Ripley attacked Rey's daughter Aalyah before dragging Dominik away, leading Rey into an assault by Bálor and Priest. At SummerSlam, the Mysterios defeated Bálor and Priest in a No Disqualification match following an interference from the returning Edge, the Judgment Day's former leader, who attacked Bálor and Priest, allowing the Mysterios to defeat them. At Clash at the Castle, after Rey and Edge defeated Bálor and Priest, Dominik hit Edge with a low blow. Rey pleaded with Dominik to stop, but Dominik hit a devastating clothesline on Rey, turning heel and disbanding the Mysterios in the process.

Feud (2022–present) 
Following his heel turn at Clash at the Castle, Dominik officially joined The Judgment Day on the September 5 episode of Raw, helping the group attack Edge and Rey. Dominik and The Judgment Day continued to torment Rey on Raw to the point that Rey informed WWE Chief Content Officer Triple H that he would rather quit than to fight Dominik. Triple H offered Rey to join the SmackDown brand instead on October 14 which Rey accepted, temporarily cooling off Rey's feud with Dominik and The Judgment Day. 

At the 2023 Royal Rumble, Rey was scheduled to enter the Royal Rumble match at #17 but did not appear when his entrance music was played. Dominik then entered at #18 wearing Rey's mask, hinting that him and/or The Judgment Day had taken out Rey. Dominik and Bálor eliminated Johnny Gargano before Dominik was eliminated by eventual winner Cody Rhodes. On the March 10 episode of SmackDown, Dominik and The Judgment Day interrupted Rey as Rey was about to address being the first inductee to the WWE Hall of Fame Class of 2023. After The Judgment Day defeated Legado Del Fantasma (who were a heel stable and had recently turned face for siding with Rey) in a six-man tag team match, Dominik taunted and goaded Rey into hitting him, saying that Rey was a "deadbeat dad" and that "[Dominik] should have been Eddie's son." On the following episode of Raw, Dominik interrupted Rey again and challenged Rey to a match at WrestleMania 39. Rey declined, saying he would never fight his own son.

Dominik ruining Rey's holidays

2022 
On Thanksgiving, Dominik invited Rhea Ripley to the Mysterio family home. Dominik and Ripley assaulted Rey after Rey and Angie (Rey's wife and Dominik's mother) refused entry into the house. 

On Christmas Eve, Dominik and Ripley visited Dominik's grandparents' home. A confrontation ensued between Dominik, Ripley, Rey and Angie outside of the house with Dominik shoving Rey and Angie slapping Ripley. The police arrived shortly after and (kayfabe) arrested Dominik. After being released from police custody, Dominik took on a new gimmick of being a former convict who "had served time in prison with the world's most dangerous people" but in reality, he was only in county jail for a few hours.

2023 
On Valentine's Day, Dominik and Ripley intruded on Rey's and Angie's Valentine's Day dinner where the latter party immediately gave up their table to the former. At the end of the dinner, Dominik fled the restaurant thinking there was a sting operation on him as "[he was] the most wanted man on TikTok" after seeing two police officers entering the premise. Ripley was left to pick up the bill before leaving.

Championships and accomplishments
 Pro Wrestling Illustrated
 Rookie of the Year (2020) – Dominik
 WWE
 WWE SmackDown Tag Team Championship (1 time)

References

External links
 
 

WWE teams and stables